Calling is an EP released by Unsraw on March 28, 2007. The release is a limited release, having only two thousand copies pressed.

Track listing
"Introduction" – 1:51
"Black Out" – 3:27
"Last Quarter" – 4:33
"Under the Skin" – 3:46
"Enshoku no Yume" (艶色の夢; "Glossy colored dream") – 3:34
"Alive" – 5:25

Personnel
Yuuki – vocals
Rai – guitar
Tetsu – guitar
Jun – bass guitar
Shou – drums
Fumihiko Sano – recording
"T-Pop" Matsushita – executive producer

Unsraw albums
2007 EPs